Blackburn railway station is located on the Lilydale and Belgrave lines in Victoria, Australia. It serves the eastern Melbourne suburb of Blackburn, and it opened on 25 December 1882.

History

On 1 December 1882, the railway line from Melbourne to Camberwell was extended to Lilydale. At this time, the Lilydale line had only a single track, and used a token-based system of signalling. On 12 August 1889, Blackburn was designated a 'crossing station', meaning that it had a loop line to allow trains to pass each other. In December 1891, a second track was added to the section of the Lilydale line, between Box Hill and Ringwood. At this time, Blackburn had two platforms.

In the late 1890s, services terminating at Blackburn began, due to the large number of passengers visiting the Blackburn Lake Sanctuary. However, there were relatively few trains passing through Blackburn; around two trains per hour in 1901.

On 17 December 1922, the Lilydale line was electrified as far as Box Hill. By the end of January 1923, electrification had proceeded past Blackburn, as far as Ringwood.

Automatic signalling, which had reached Box Hill in 1929, was finally extended to Blackburn on 13 July 1958. However, automatic signalling was not installed between Blackburn and Mitcham until 13 November 1960. In 1970, boom barriers replaced hand gates at the former Blackburn Road level crossing, which was located nearby in the Down direction of the station.

By October 1977, the goods yard was closed to traffic. In 1980, the goods siding was removed and the old station was demolished (although part of the south platform building remains). It was replaced with a three-platform station, so trains could terminate while Box Hill was being rebuilt. A new ramp from the old tunnel now provides pedestrian access to the central island platform. Victorian Railways' plan in the late 1970s was to add the third track to the south, but Nunawading Council objected.

On 4 June 1996, Blackburn was upgraded to a Premium Station. By 2001, all services that formerly terminated at Box Hill had been extended to Blackburn.

In late 2006 and early 2007, grade separation works at the Middleborough Road level crossing, near Laburnum, led to the closure of the line between Box Hill and Blackburn, and the construction of a temporary bus interchange at the station for buses which replaced train services. The car-park immediately to the north of Platform 3 was converted into an interchange, and a walkway was constructed to allow passengers to cross from the island platform to the interchange. In early 2010, Blackburn again performed this role, when grade separation was undertaken at Springvale Road and Nunawading was rebuilt, and again in 2014, when Mitcham Road and Rooks Road at Mitcham were separated.

In May 2014, the Victorian State Government announced a grade separation project to replace the nearby Blackburn Road level crossing, with a completion date of 2017. The project was a part of the Level Crossing Removal Project. In early 2016, construction commenced and, during late 2016-early 2017, a major shutdown of the line and Blackburn Road occurred, enabling the removal of the level crossing. In early February 2017, Blackburn Road and the railway line reopened. The project also included two new lift shafts from the island platform to the underpass, and to nearby Railway Road. In July of that year, the entire project works were completed. Also in that year, the former signal box at the station was abolished, with control transferred to Ringwood.

Facilities, platforms and services

Blackburn has one island platform with two faces and one side platform. The island platform features a ticket office and toilets.

Platform 3 is only used on weekdays during peak hours (when trains are terminating on Platform 2). This typically occurs from early morning; 7am-12:30pm, and mid afternoon; 15:30-18:30.

It is serviced by Metro Trains' Lilydale and Belgrave line services.

Platform 1:
  all stations and limited express services to Flinders Street
  all stations and limited express services to Flinders Street

Platform 2:
  all stations and limited express services to Flinders Street
  all stations and limited express services to Flinders Street
  all stations services to Lilydale
  all stations and limited express services to Belgrave

Platform 3: (Weekdays only)
  all stations services to Lilydale
  all stations and limited express services to Belgrave

Transport links

Kinetic Melbourne operates three routes via Blackburn station, under contract to Public Transport Victoria:
 : Box Hill station – Ringwood station
 : Box Hill station – Westfield Doncaster (deviation)
  : Frankston station – Melbourne Airport

Ventura Bus Lines operates three routes via Blackburn station, under contract to Public Transport Victoria:
  : to Middle Brighton station
 : to Mitcham station
 : Mitcham station – Box Hill station

References

External links
 
 Melway map

Premium Melbourne railway stations
Railway stations in Melbourne
Railway stations in Australia opened in 1882
Railway stations in the City of Whitehorse